Philip Anthony Mair Heald (born August 25, 1944) is an American character actor known for portraying Hannibal Lecter's jailer, Dr. Frederick Chilton, in The Silence of the Lambs and Red Dragon, and for playing assistant principal Scott Guber in David E. Kelley's Boston Public. Heald also had a recurring role as Judge Cooper on Kelley's The Practice and Boston Legal. He had a prominent role as a troubled psychic in The X-Files episode "Closure".

Early life and education
Heald was born in New Rochelle, New York, the son of an editor. He graduated from Michigan State University in 1971.

Career

Heald has worked extensively on Broadway and has been twice nominated for the Tony Award for his work as Lord Evelyn Oakleigh in Anything Goes (1988) and Terrence McNally's Love! Valour! Compassion! (1995). He also appeared in McNally's The Lisbon Traviata (1989), Inherit the Wind (1998), Deep Rising (1998), and Lips Together, Teeth Apart (1991).

Heald recorded over 60 audio books/books on tape, including works as varied as Where the Red Fern Grows, The New York Times bestsellers such as The Pelican Brief (in the film adaptation of which he also played a villainous lawyer), Jurassic Park and Midnight in the Garden of Good and Evil, Moby-Dick, several works by science fiction writer Philip K. Dick, as well as a sizable number of titles in the Star Wars audio book library.

He made brief appearances in Miami Vice ("The Prodigal Son"), X-Men: The Last Stand (2006 film), and the Cheers series finale "One for the Road". He later appeared on the Cheers spin-off Frasier in a recurring role. He appeared in Unaccompanied Minors as a distressed, Christmas-hating airport employee.

Personal life
Heald lives in Ashland, Oregon, with his wife Robin (daughter of violist Karen Tuttle) and children Zoe and Dylan. He has converted to Judaism, his wife's faith. He regularly performs in productions of the Oregon Shakespeare Festival. During the 2010 season of the Oregon Shakespeare Festival, Heald played Shylock in Shakespeare's The Merchant of Venice.

Partial filmography

 1983 Silkwood as 2nd Doctor At Union Meeting
 1984 Teachers as Narc
 1984 The Beniker Gang as Mr. Uldrich
 1986 Fresno as Kevin Kensington
 1986 Tales from the Darkside episode "Comet Watch" (2/13) as Englebert Ames 
 1987 Outrageous Fortune as Agent Weldon
 1987 Happy New Year as Dinner Guest
 1987 Orphans as Man In Park
 1990 Postcards from the Edge as George Lazan
 1991 The Silence of the Lambs as Dr. Frederick Chilton
 1991 The Super as Ron Nessim
 1992 Whispers in the Dark as Paul
 1993 Searching for Bobby Fischer as Fighting Parent
 1993 The Ballad of Little Jo as Henry Grey
 1993 The Pelican Brief as Marty Velmano
 1994 The Client as FBI Agent Larry Trumann
 1995 Kiss of Death as Attorney Jack Gold
 1995 Bushwhacked as Reinhart Bragdon
 1996 A Time to Kill as Dr. Wilbert Rodeheaver
 1998 Deep Rising as Simon Canton
 1999 8mm as Daniel Longdale
 2000 Proof of Life as Ted Fellner
 2002 Red Dragon as Dr. Frederick Chilton
 2006 X-Men: The Last Stand as FBI Mystique Interrogator
 2006 Accepted as Dean Richard Van Horne
 2014 Sam & Cat (TV Series) as Dr. Slarm
 2020 Alone as Robert

References

External links
 
 
 

1944 births
Male actors from Oregon
American male stage actors
American male television actors
Converts to Judaism
Living people
Michigan State University alumni
People from Ashland, Oregon
Male actors from New Rochelle, New York
American male film actors
20th-century American male actors
American people of English descent